Koćura is a village in the municipality of Vranje, Serbia. According to the 2002 census, the village has a population of 234 people. Chetnik Petar Koćura was born in the village.

References

Populated places in Pčinja District